"I Never Picked Cotton" is a song made famous by country music singer Roy Clark. Written by Bobby George and Charlie Williams, the song was released in 1970 as the title track to the album released that same year. The song peaked at No. 5 on the Billboard magazine Hot Country Singles chart that summer. Charlie Williams wrote several songs that Roy Clark recorded, including "Right or Left at Oak Street."

Song plot

The story is told in first-person narrative from the perspective of an Oklahoma native, the youngest of three children from a destitute sharecropping family.  In the song's chorus, the protagonist recalls how his mother, brother and sister all picked cotton while his dad, a coal miner, suffered an untimely death.

In the first verse, the man recalls his family's past and his own upbringing, and swore to himself that once he was old enough he would leave the farm and his family behind.  He eventually made good on his promise in the second verse, stealing ten dollars and a pick-up truck and absconding from his homestead, never to return.  From then on the man lived a hedonistic lifestyle replete with "fast cars and whiskey, long-haired girls and fun", which he financed through armed robbery ("I had everything that money could bring, and I took it all with a gun").

In the final verse, the man's reckless lifestyle culminates in aggravated murder while in Memphis when he kills a redneck who insults him.  Arrested and convicted for the crime, the man is sentenced to death by hanging, and the night before his execution, he reflects on his decadent life and notes that, "In the time I've got, there ain't a hell of a lot that I can look back on with pride", except that he kept his promise to himself to "never pick cotton".

Cover versions
A cover version of "I Never Picked Cotton" was recorded by Johnny Cash for his 1996 album Unchained.

Chart positions

Roy Clark version

References
Whitburn, Joel, "Top Country Songs: 1944-2005," 2006.
[ Allmusic — I Never Picked Cotton by Roy Clark].

1970 singles
Roy Clark songs
Songs about labor